The 2023–24 3. Liga will be the 16th season of the 3. Liga. It will start on 4 August 2023 and will conclude on 18 May 2024.

Teams

Stadiums and locations

Personnel and kits

League table

References

External links
Official website

2023–24 in German football leagues
2023–24

Germany, 3